Cathie M. Wright (May 18, 1929 – April 14, 2012) was an American politician from California and a member of the Republican party.

Early career

A onetime Simi Valley councilwoman, Wright was serving as mayor in 1980 when she won election to the California State Assembly seat vacated by Republican Bob Cline, who had made an unsuccessful run for state senate. She represented the Ventura county based 37th district until 1992, when she opted not to seek reelection.
 In 1992 she would run for the California State Senate. She won her race and would hold the office until 2000 and term limits would not allow her to run again. 
 The Honorable State Senator Cathie Wright would dabble a little in campaign consulting, but found being a grandmother was what she really wanted to do. She had given so much time to the state she felt it was time for family. 
Now she was a neighborhood council member, planning commission member and actually ran for city council in Simi Valley four times, before getting elected. 
When she was elected to the city council at the time the custom had been for the person who came in with the most votes, is named mayor. Now this is not something they wanted to give Cathie ( she would be the first woman mayor), so the gave it to Ginger Gherardi (a woman without attitude)only for her to be recalled a year later. It was at this time the council chose to have the mayor independently elected. So, Cathie would run for Mayor winning again by a landslide. 
It was then in the earlier part of the 80’s when all of the state hospitals were shut down due to the abuses that were taking place. Caring about children and seeing how those who had learning disabilities tended to end up at a greater risk of incarceration. Cathie began talking to those in her county who saw how these children were slipping through the cracks. Do with the help of Ventura County Health Department and doctors she came up with a program that would recognize at risk youth and pull them aside for special classes. The classes would deal with the current and future needs of the child. The pilot program started in the County of Ventura. The program would become known as The System of Cares Mental Health program. 
The program was then accepted as a state wide program implemented in every county. While Pete Wilson was still governor both Cathie and Pete would go to Washington DC and present her bill to Congress. Congress then voted and passed the program to become a national program. Thus also allowed the federal government to match dollar to dollar what the state spent on the program. So if California spent a million dollars on the program then the federal government would give a million to be used in the program.
Since the start of the program it has been expanded to include adults. The program is the gold standard for addressing youth with learning challenges! 
Child Support was another issues she helped to spear head into the program the State of California currently uses.

State senate

After 12 years in the Assembly, Wright instead ran for the open 19th state senate district held since 1980 by Republican stalwart Ed Davis, a former Los Angeles police chief. Davis didn't much like Wright (whom he dubbed "The Peroxide Princess of Simi Valley") and recruited former Assemblywoman Marion W. La Follette to run for the seat. After a bitter campaign, Wright prevailed, but just barely. She won reelection easily in 1996, but California state Term Limits prevented her from seeking reelection in 2000.
While a State Senator she worked tirelessly on legislation that would improve the lives of those she represented. Simi got a DMV and then the train station, both at the time many thought were unnecessary, but soon proved a big necessity in the community as it grew pass 100,000 residents.
She was a honest politician and never made any promises as she felt there was no promise that she could keep. When talking to people she would explain that it was not just her up in Sacramento making laws but many others. Her ability to reach across the isle was proven when she worked with the democrats to bring about welfare reform to California.
One trait that everyone who knew her agreed she had was tenacity along with the i for not gave to go along yo be a Republican. It hit her into trouble with the republicans, but she felt she was elected to represent all of her district and to do so meant sometimes nit agreeing with her own party. To her it was a give and take, no one she would say ever got everything they want but you meet half way so you can do for those who elected you.

Lieutenant governor race

In 1994 she became the Republican nominee for Lt. Governor by defeating moderate Assemblyman Stan Statham in the party's primary. Statham was best known for a proposal to split California into three states. Wright beat him handily but was soundly defeated by then Democratic state Controller Gray Davis in the general election.

Controversy

One issue that has constantly dogged Wright was her seeking the help of then Democratic Assembly Speaker Willie Brown in an effort to have a judge go easy on her daughter, who had racked up numerous traffic violations.

Electoral history

References

External links 
 Cathie Wright at ballotpedia.org
 Cathie Wright at ourcampaigns.com
 Cathie Wright at votesmart.org
 Join California Cathie M. Wright

1929 births
Republican Party California state senators
2012 deaths
Republican Party members of the California State Assembly
Women state legislators in California
Mayors of places in California
People from Simi Valley, California
Women mayors of places in California
20th-century American politicians
21st-century American politicians
20th-century American women
People from Old Forge, Lackawanna County, Pennsylvania
21st-century American women politicians
20th-century American women politicians